Windrush Day was introduced in June 2018 on the 70th anniversary of the Windrush migration. Though Windrush Day is not a bank holiday in the United Kingdom, it is an observed day. It is on 22 June. It was instituted following a successful campaign led by Patrick Vernon.

History 
On 22 June 1948, 492 Caribbean people were brought to Tilbury Docks, Essex, in the UK, on the Empire Windrush ship. News reports at the time reported that the number of people was 492, but the ship's records show that the ship was carrying 1,027 passengers. According to the passenger lists, 802 of those on board the ship gave their last country of residence as somewhere in the Caribbean. After World War II, the United Kingdom's economy needed to be repaired. To do so, the British government recruited Afro-Caribbean migrants and offered them jobs. These jobs included the production of steel, coal, iron, and food, and also jobs in the service sector, such as running public transport and staffing the new National Health Service in the United Kingdom.

The first African-Caribbean immigrants in the United Kingdom were faced with extreme intolerance from many in the white population. Although African-Caribbean migrants were encouraged to settle in the United Kingdom and take up employment to relieve the labour market by the authorities, many early immigrants were denied access to private employment and accommodation because of the colour of their skin. Black people were also banned from many pubs, clubs, and even churches.

Campaign
Patrick Vernon was the first to call for the commemoration of "Windrush Day", to recognise the migrant contribution to UK society, on the day when the first big group of post-war migrants from the West Indies arrived in Britain. Vernon first launched a petition to this effect in 2013, which was followed by a further campaign in 2018, at the height of the Windrush scandal. Official backing was given when it was subsequently announced by the government that an annual Windrush Day would be celebrated on 22 June, supported by a grant of up to £500,000, to recognise and honour the contribution of the Windrush Generation and their descendants and to "keep their legacy alive for future generations, ensuring that we all celebrate the diversity of Britain's history."

Modern day 

The purpose of Windrush Day is to encourage "communities across the country to celebrate the contribution of the Windrush Generation and their descendants," according to the United Kingdom government. "A Windrush Day will allow communities up and down the country to recognise and honour the enormous contribution of those who stepped ashore at Tilbury Docks 70 years ago," said communities minister Lord Bourne. Government funding helps a variety of events and activities to take place, such as the day dance performances, exhibitions, and debate.

On Windrush Day 2021, a plaque was erected in memory of British immigrant rights activist Paulette Wilson, a member of the "Windrush generation" (which term usually refers to those who were born in the Caribbean and settled in the UK between 1948 and 1971). The plaque was launched with campaigners including Patrick Vernon and Claire Darke as well as her family at the Wolverhampton Heritage Centre. The Centre is a cornerstone of the area's local Caribbean community and was formerly the constituency office of Enoch Powell, where the infamous "Rivers of Blood" speech was written.

References

External links
 "Windrush Day in the United Kingdom", at timeanddate.com

Black British history
Caribbean British
June observances
Windrush